Longana Airport is an airport in Longana, Vanuatu .

Airlines and destinations

References

Airports in Vanuatu
Penama Province